Ahmad Abubakar Ghali (born 23 June 2000) is a Nigerian footballer who plays for Slovan Liberec as a right winger.

Club career

AS Trenčín
Ghali made his Fortuna Liga debut for AS Trenčín against FK Pohronie on 13 June 2020.

References

External links
 AS Trenčín official club profile 
 Futbalnet profile 
 
 

2000 births
Living people
Sportspeople from Kano
Nigerian footballers
Nigerian expatriate footballers
Association football forwards
AS Trenčín players
FK Dubnica players
FC Slovan Liberec players
Slovak Super Liga players
2. Liga (Slovakia) players
Czech First League players
Nigerian expatriate sportspeople in Slovakia
Nigerian expatriate sportspeople in the Czech Republic
Expatriate footballers in Slovakia
Expatriate footballers in the Czech Republic